Nicola Sambo (born 16 November 1995) is an Italian professional footballer who plays as a goalkeeper.

Club career
On 8 November 2018, he signed with Serie B club Carpi until the end of the 2018–19 season.

In August 2019, he moved to Serie D club Luparense. He left the club again in December 2019.

References

1995 births
Footballers from Venice
Living people
Italian footballers
A.C. ChievoVerona players
F.C. Lumezzane V.G.Z. A.S.D. players
Spezia Calcio players
Santarcangelo Calcio players
Venezia F.C. players
U.S. Livorno 1915 players
A.C. Carpi players
Serie C players
Serie D players
Association football goalkeepers